This is a list of stations of the Seville Metro system.

The first line is administered by Seville Metro.

Sorted alphabetically

In service

Expansion plans

Current 
Presently, the Seville Metro has a set of expansion goals that are due to be achieved by 2017. Major projects include these stations:

Distant projects 
It is unknown when and if these will be built, but nonetheless plans do exist for them:

Seville
 
Seville